This is a list of Serie A winning football managers. Serie A is the men's top professional football division of the Italian football league system. Prior to 1930, it was known by other names, such as Divisione Nazionale.

Seasons and winning managers

Most wins by individual

Notes

See also 
List of Italian football champions
Serie A Coach of the Year
List of English football championship winning managers
List of La Liga winning managers
List of Ligue 1 winning managers

References 

Football managers in Italy
 
Serie A winning managers